Luis Alberto "Beto" Satragni (1955 – 19 September 2010) was an Uruguayan musician, composer and bassist whose career developed mainly in Argentina.

Biography 

Satragni developed his career in Argentina, as a bassist in Argentine rock bands.

During the 1970s, he formed the candombe-rock band Raíces jointly with Roberto Valencia.

In the early 1980s, he formed a duo with Oscar Moro: Moro-Satragni, and released an eponymous album, including vocals by Charly García, David Lebón and Luis Alberto Spinetta. Satragni later left this group, joining Spinetta Jade. In 1983, he joined David Lebon, and in 1985 joined Ruben Rada's band.

In 1986 he formed "El 60" with Hector Starc, with little impact.

Satragni reprised songs from Spinetta Jade in the December 2009 recital Spinetta and the Eternal Bands, which covered the entire career of Spinetta and his associated acts.

They collaborated with diverse Argentinian musicians such as Moris, Lito Nebbia, Miguel Abuelo, León Gieco, David Lebón and the Uruguayan Osvaldo Fattoruso and Ruben Roadstead, among others.

Return to Uruguay 
In 2002, Satragni returned to Canelones, forming Montevideo Grouve in the year 2006. Satragni led the group "Emergentes" at a meeting of local bands in the Costa de Oro. The band La Tercera Expedición paid homage to Satragni, covering one of his songs.

Health complications resulted in his death on 19 September 2010 in Montevideo.

Discography

References

Uruguayan bass guitarists
Male bass guitarists
Rock bass guitarists
20th-century Uruguayan male singers
2010 deaths
1955 births
People from Canelones Department
Argentine rock musicians
Rock en Español musicians
Uruguayan male guitarists